Melvin David Ingram (July 4, 1904 – October 28, 1979) was a Major League Baseball player.

Ingram was born in Asheville, North Carolina and died in Medford, Oregon. He attended Gonzaga University from 1925 to 1929 where he played football, basketball, baseball and also ran track. He lettered in all four sports - resulting in 15 of 16 total letters in his days at Gonzaga. After college he signed with Pittsburgh, only after being guaranteed an early release to go into coaching college baseball in Wallace, Idaho for the Bulldogs from 1925-1928.

References

External links

Pittsburgh Pirates players
1904 births
1979 deaths
Baseball players from North Carolina
Sportspeople from Asheville, North Carolina
Sportspeople from Medford, Oregon
Gonzaga Bulldogs baseball players